The 1967 St. Louis Cardinals season was the team's 48th year with the National Football League (NFL) and the 8th season in St. Louis.

Offseason

Roster

Regular season

Schedule

Game summaries

Week 14

Standings

References

External links 
 1967 St. Louis Cardinals at Pro-Football-Reference.com

St. Louis
1967 in sports in Missouri
Arizona Cardinals seasons